Four of a Kind is the debut feature film for director Fiona Cochrane. It was completed in 2008 and released in 2009.

It is based on the stage play Disclosure by Helen Collins as presented at La Mama Theatre (Melbourne) during the 2006 Melbourne Fringe Festival. It was shot on location in Melbourne, Australia.

Synopsis: Lies. Betrayal. Blackmail. Murder.

Four different women, each with a well-hidden secret they are coaxed, tricked or forced into revealing. 
Through a veil of lies all four flirt with the truth as they experience betrayal, ambition, loneliness, pain and anger.  
But the lies they tell themselves might be the ones that hurt the most.

" … beneath its deceptively simple surface lies an emotionally lacerating psychological whodunit of unusual complexity" – Paul Harris, Film Buffs Forecast

'Not far off being a hidden Australian gem that you should race out to'- Ben McEachen, Empire Magazine

'Tingling with adult tension!’ – John Flaus, The Melbourne Review

Reception
Film reviews include:

References

External links
 Trailer:  https://www.youtube.com/watch?v=KwViMWp1YFI&feature=channel&list=UL
 
 La Mama – list of 2006 productions
 Melbourne Fringe Festival Listing
 Profile on Director – Fiona Cochrane
 Production Company F-reel

2008 films
Australian thriller drama films
2000s English-language films
2000s Australian films